Hizb is a part of Quran.

Hizb or Hezb may also refer to:
 Hizb Rateb is a collective recitation in Sufism.
 Rub el Hizb is an Islamic symbol.
 Hizbul Mujahideen, Islamist militant group in Kashmir